Sandra Ida Christina Bergqvist (born 14 April 1980 at Nagu) is a Finnish politician serving as member of parliament for the Finland Proper constituency. She was elected to the Parliament in 2019. She is also the chairperson of the Swedish Assembly of Finland.

References 

1980 births
Living people
People from Pargas
Swedish-speaking Finns
Swedish People's Party of Finland politicians
Members of the Parliament of Finland (2019–23)
21st-century Finnish women politicians
Åbo Akademi University alumni